Patrick Wolfgang Kapp (born 20 July 1997) is a German professional footballer who plays as a defender for VfB Stuttgart II.

Career
On 19 June 2017, Kapp signed with FC Sochaux-Montbéliard, joining from the youth academy of 1899 Hoffenheim where he captained their academy sides. Kapp made his professional debut for Sochaux in a 1–1 Ligue 2 tie with Chamois Niortais on 30 March 2018.

References

External links
 
 
 
 

1997 births
Living people
People from Illertissen
Sportspeople from Swabia (Bavaria)
Association football defenders
German footballers
Footballers from Bavaria
TSG Balingen players
TSG 1899 Hoffenheim II players
FC Sochaux-Montbéliard players
FC Viktoria 1889 Berlin players
VfB Stuttgart II players
Ligue 2 players
3. Liga players
Regionalliga players
German expatriate footballers
German expatriate sportspeople in France
Expatriate footballers in France